The Chairman's Stakes is a South Australian Jockey Club Group 3 Thoroughbred horse race for three-year-olds, at set weights, over a distance of 2,000 metres at the Morphettville Racecourse, Adelaide, Australia in the Autumn Carnival.

History
The race is considered a prep lead-up race for the Group 1 South Australian Derby which is usually run a couple of weeks after this race at the same track. 

Four horses have won the Chairman's–SA Derby double:
Markham (1997), Mummify (2003), Rebel Raider (2009), Howard Be Thy Name (2016), Leicester (2018)

Name
1983–1992 - Chairman's Stakes
1993–2003 - The Veuve Clicquot Stakes 
2004–2005 - Yalumba Plate 
2006–2008 - Chairman's Stakes
2009–2010 - Chairman's TAB Stakes 
2011 - Chairman's Tattsbet Stakes 
2012 - Chairman's Stakes
2013 - Chairman's Veolia Stakes
2014 onwards - Chairman's Stakes

Distance

 1983–1984 -  2000 metres
 1985 - 1850 metres
 1986–1989 -  2000 metres
 1990 - 2003 metres
 1991–1992 - 2250 metres
 1993 - 2014 metres
 1994–2000 - 2000 metres
 2001 - 2024 metres
 2002 - 2000 metres
 2003 - 2025 metres
 2004 - 2024 metres
 2005 - 2031 metres
 2006–2007 - 2020 metres
 2008–2009 - 2000 metres
 2010 - 2014 metres
 2011 - 2020 metres
 2012–2014 - 2000 metres
 2015–2016 - 2020 metres
 2017 - 2030 metres
 2018 - 2035 metres

Grade

1982–2010 - Listed Race
2011 onwards - Group 3

Venue
 1983–1984 -  Victoria Park
 1985 - Cheltenham Park
 1986–1990 -  Victoria Park
 1991–1992 - Cheltenham Park
 1993–2001 -  Morphettville
 2002 -  Victoria Park
 2003 onwards -  Morphettville

Winners

 2022 - Jungle Magnate   
2021 - Royal Mile   
2020 - Dalasan   
2019 - Declarationofheart   
2018 - Leicester   
2017 - Waging War      
2016 - Howard Be Thy Name      
2015 - October Date      
2014 - Gamblin' Guru                  
2013 - Hioctdane                       
2012 - Heavens Riches                
2011 - Kittens    
2010 - Red Colossus   
2009 - Rebel Raider                   
2008 - Zagreb                       
2007 - Family Guy                        
2006 - Obglo                              
2005 - Threedee       
2004 - Roll On Royce             
2003 - Mummify    
2002 - Silver Baron   
2001 - Bush Padre             
2000 - Shorblue                 
1999 - Seasquill                       
1998 - Pennyweight Point                 
1997 - Markham                         
1996 - Beserk                           
1995 - Our Marquise                   
1994 - Striking Twig                  
1993 - Raising Kentucky             
1992 - Dendy Park                 
1991 - Dubai Desert
1990 - Double Gin                
1989 - Leica Rock
1988 - Jolly Good Thought
1987 - Scotch Caper
1986 - Hydrology
1985 - Unconquered
1984 - Tea Biscuit
1983 - Lady Vanessa

See also
 List of Australian Group races
 Group races

References

Horse races in Australia
Sport in Adelaide